Vincent Valentini (died 1948) was a screenwriter in the United States. He wrote the musical score for The American Red Cross Nurse. He wrote the 1928 theatrical production Parisiana.

An advertisement for the 1946 film Beale Street Mama includes the notation "Hit tunes by Vincent Valentini".

Filmography
Sex Madness (1938), co-wrote
Paradise in Harlem (1939), from a story by Frank H. Wilson
Sunday Sinners (1940), from a story by Frank H. Wilson
Murder on Lenox Avenue (1941), co-wrote with Bryna Ivens
Beale Street Mama (1946), wrote music
Boy! What a Girl! (1946)
Stars on Parade (1946)
Sepia Cinderella (1947)
Miracle in Harlem (1948), story and screenplay

References

1948 deaths
American screenwriters
20th-century American screenwriters